Valook Weir is a small diversion dam constructed across Kavadippuzha in Naripatta panchayath of Kozhikode district in Kerala, India. It is one of the two weirs of Vilangad SHEP. It is located 85 km away from Kozhikode town. It is a run- off the river scheme utilizing water of Vaniyampuzha and Kavadipuzha.

Power Project
It is a 7.5 MW (3 x 2.50 MW) power project built on Vaniyampuzha and Kavadipuzha, the tributaries of Mahe river, with an investment of Rs 59.49 crore INR. The project consists of dams at Panoth and Valookku and two canals (1750 meter long Valook Canal and 2850 meter long Panoth canal) and a fore-bay tank with a penstock pipe.  This Along with three 2.5 MW generators creates the Power and the water flows through a 124-meter tailrace channel. The power generated is conveyed to Nadapuram substation which is 14 kilometers away from the power house.

Specifications 

 LocationLatitude:11⁰45’36.5”N
 Longitude:75⁰46’32.5”E
 Panchayath : Naripatta
 Village: Thinur
 District:Kozhikode
 River Basin : Mahe puzha
 River: Kavadi puzha
 Release from Dam to river : Mahe puzha
 Taluk through which release flows Vadakara
 Year of completion : 2014
 Name of Project : Vilangad Small Hydro Electric Project
 Purpose of Project : Hydro Power
Dam Features
 Type of Dam : Concrete gravity
 Classification : weir
 Maximum Water Level (MWL):EL 184.96 m
 Full Reservoir Level ( FRL) : EL 183.90 m
 Storage at FRL : Diversion only
 Height from deepest foundation : 7.90m
 Length :45.95m
 Spillway : 2 Nos. 1.50 x 1.30 m
 Crest Level : EL 183.90 m
 River Outlet: NIL
 Officers in charge & phone No. : Executive Engineer, KG Division, Kakkayam, PIN-673615 Phone.9446008466
 Installed capacity of the Project : 7.5 MW

External links
Vilangad Small Hydro Electric Project

References 

Dams in Kerala
Dams completed in 2014